It's a Sin is a British drama miniseries written by Russell T Davies. Set in London between 1981 and 1991, it depicts the lives of a group of gay men and their friends during the HIV/AIDS crisis in the United Kingdom. It's a Sin features a main cast consisting of Olly Alexander, Omari Douglas, Callum Scott Howells, Lydia West, and Nathaniel Curtis. Other actors cast were David Carlyle, Keeley Hawes, Shaun Dooley, Tracy Ann Oberman, Neil Patrick Harris and Stephen Fry. The series was directed by Peter Hoar, produced by Red Production Company, and premiered in the United Kingdom on Channel 4 on 22 January 2021.

Its subject matter made the series a difficult sell to broadcasters. BBC One and ITV passed on the series, and Channel 4 took it on only after their commissioning editor of drama, Lee Mason, fought for it and the series was shortened from a planned eight episodes to five. Principal photography commenced on 7 October 2019. Despite its London setting, It's a Sin was filmed mainly in Manchester, with other locations used in Liverpool, Bolton, Eccles, Bangor, and Rhos-on-Sea. The series was executive produced by Davies, Hoar, and Nicola Shindler, with Phil Collinson serving as producer.

The show received critical acclaim for its emotional scenes, writing, performances and accurate depiction of HIV/AIDS. All episodes were released to Channel 4's online streaming service All 4, where it was viewed in its entirety more than 6.5 million times; making it the most binge-watched show to stream on the platform. The first episode also became Channel 4's biggest drama launch. The show also created an upsurge in HIV testing. It was the most nominated show at the 2022 British Academy Television Awards, receiving eleven nominations, including Best Mini-Series.

Premise
The series follows a group of gay men who move to London in 1981. They form a friendship group but the fast developing HIV/AIDS crisis in the United Kingdom impacts their lives. Over five episodes the group are shown living through an entire decade until 1991, as they become determined to live fiercely despite the threat HIV poses to them.

Cast and characters

 Olly Alexander as Ritchie Tozer
 David Carlyle as Gregory "Gloria" Finch
 Nathaniel Curtis as Ash Mukherjee
 Shaun Dooley as Clive Tozer
 Omari Douglas as Roscoe Babatunde
 Callum Scott Howells as Colin "Gladys Pugh" Morris-Jones
 Tracy-Ann Oberman as Carol Carter
 Lydia West as Jill Baxter
 Keeley Hawes as Valerie Tozer
 Neil Patrick Harris as Henry Coltrane
 Stephen Fry as Arthur Garrison MP

 Moya Brady as Millie
 Neil Ashton as Grizzle
 Nicholas Blane as Mr Hart
 William Richardson as Mr Brewster
 Ashley McGuire as Lorraine Fletcher
 Calvin A. Dean as Clifford
 Nathaniel Hall as Donald Bassett
 Jill Nalder as Christine Baxter
 Andria Doherty, as Eileen Morris-Jones
 Nathan Sussex as Pete
 Toto Bruin as Lucy Tozer
 Shaniqua Okwok as Solly Babatunde
 Michelle Greenidge as Rosa Babatunde
 Delroy Brown as Oscar Babatunde
 Ken Christiansen as Karl Benning
 David Fleeshman as father

Episodes

Production

Development

Davies' plans to write a series depicting gay life during the 1980s and the UK AIDS crisis were based on his own and his friends' experiences, and to commemorate the generation who died from the illness. Davies first publicised these plans in January 2015, telling Ben Dowell from Radio Times in 2016 that it was "the most research-based piece I will ever do". Davies has claimed that the script was initially difficult to pitch to broadcasters due to the "tough" subject matter. Davies recalls being asked by a producer to start the show on an AIDS ward in the 90s, then flashing back to the 80s. He refused the idea, calling it 'unbelievably crass'. Davies spent a year trying to secure a deal, with two broadcasters declining to commission the show. It was originally pitched to Davies' first choice, Channel 4, but they declined to commission it. BBC One was then offered the series but they too declined, and ITV decided that they were not ready to broadcast such a series. Channel 4's Commissioning Editor of Drama, Lee Mason, had originally wanted his network to commission the show. He waited for a significant staff change before successfully pitching the idea. Davies originally envisaged the show as an eight-part drama; Channel 4 requested that it be limited to four episodes, and Davies was able to negotiate five.

On 22 August 2018 at the Edinburgh International Television Festival, Channel 4's commission of Davies' script was announced. The show was still titled The Boys and it was confirmed that production would commence in 2019. Davies developed the series with Nicola Shindler, who served as Executive Producer and had the assistance of her Red Production Company. Phil Collinson was hired as the show's producer and Peter Hoar as a director. Murray Gold was hired to create the music score for the series. In early 2020, it was revealed that the show was tentatively titled Boys instead of The Boys as previously reported. The original working title was then changed because it was too similar to the Amazon series The Boys. In the fourth episode, Ritchie Tozer appears in a fictional 1988 Doctor Who episode, titled "Regression of the Daleks" as a tribute to Dursley McLinden, a mutual friend of Jill Nalder and Davies, who appeared in Remembrance of the Daleks.

Casting
The majority of the show's casting was announced in October 2019. Olly Alexander, a vocalist from the band Years & Years was cast as Ritchie Tozer, a gay teenager who moves to London in 1981 during the early days of the crisis. In his television debut, Omari Douglas was cast as Roscoe Babatunde, a man from a Nigerian family who disown him because of his sexuality. Welsh actor Callum Scott Howells was cast in his first television role playing Colin Morris-Jones, a gay man from Wales. Lydia West plays Jill Baxter in the series. She would regularly host 1980s themed gatherings to help the cast cope with the show's emotional subject. Nathaniel Curtis successfully auditioned for the part of Ash Mukherjee. He was working in theatre when he first discovered the role and said he "instantly fell in love" with the script. David Carlyle plays Gregory Finch, a "vibrant" and "naughty" character who works as a bus conductor.

American actor Neil Patrick Harris plays Henry Coltrane, a character who dies from AIDS in the first episode. The actor said he was pleased with his casting and "incredibly proud" to appear in the series. Keeley Hawes and Shaun Dooley signed up to play Ritchie's parents Valerie and Clive Tozer. Stephen Fry was cast as Arthur Garrison, a Conservative MP who refuses to acknowledge his homosexuality. Fry was keen to appear in the series because he believed it paid tribute to friends that died of HIV. Producers cast Nathaniel Hall as Donald Bassett. Hall plays an HIV-positive character and is himself HIV-positive. Other castings included Andria Doherty as Eileen Morris-Jones and Tracy Ann Oberman as Carol Carter, an acting agent who signs up Ritchie.

It's a Sin's cast includes a number of openly gay and queer performers including Alexander, Fry, Harris, Howells, Hall and Carlyle. This casting was intentional; Davies stated "for my one programme, for these five hours, I wanted to create a safe space where gay actors could voluntarily come in and be themselves." Certain characters were influenced by Davies' real-life friends. West's character, Jill Baxter, is "very loosely" based on Davies' friend Jill Nalder, who appears in the show as Baxter's mother.

Filming
Principal photography began in Manchester on 7 October 2019. Red Production Company went into partnership with Screen Manchester to accommodate filming. Bobby Cochrane, development manager at Screen Manchester told Adam Maidment from the Manchester Evening News that "we worked very closely with the production on their various filming applications across Manchester." It's a Sin is set in 1980s England and to reflect the times a series of period props were introduced to outdoor filming locations. Manchester transport officials helped the production gain necessary control over specific areas. Filming took place at Paton Street, Victoria Baths, The Embassy Club on Rochdale Road, The Star and Garter, the Thirsty Scholar on New Wakefield Street and Manchester Crematorium on Barlow Moor Road. Additional filming then took place at a shopping centre in Eccles, a residential street in Heaton Moor and Le Mans Crescent in Bolton.
 
Filming took place in the city centre of Liverpool in January 2020. The location shoot commenced on Water Street for scenes which appeared as New York City in the show. The street was closed to the public and rows of yellow taxis were parked in the street. In addition vintage cars and a New York-style hot dog cart were placed at the scene. Filming at the Cunard Building on Brunswick Street doubled as a London hotel. A series of 2D and CG VFX techniques were used to add to the location's authenticity. Additional interiors were filmed at the Old Wentworth High School in Eccles. Hospital scenes featured in the show were filmed at this location. Filming also took place in Rhos-on-Sea, Wales, which doubled for the Isle of Wight. Scenes featuring a beach and pier were filmed in the Welsh city of Bangor. Filming concluded on 31 January 2020.

Release
A first-look image was released on 14 January 2020, via a press release given to those in attendance at a Channel 4 press event. The series was originally scheduled for a 2020 release. On 2 October 2020, Channel 4 released the first official teaser trailer and with a statement that it would be broadcast in 2021. On 17 December 2020, a full trailer was released.

In Ireland and the UK, the series premiered on 22 January 2021 on Channel 4. Shortly after the broadcast of the first episode, all episodes were available to stream for free on Channel 4's on-demand streaming service, All 4. Coinciding with the broadcast, Alexander's band Years & Years released a cover of the song "It's a Sin", which was originally performed by the Pet Shop Boys. The release, used to promote the series was also used to raise money for the George House Trust, a charity supporting those living with HIV. It was released on DVD and Blu-ray in the United Kingdom on 22 February 2021.

It was announced in December 2019 that HBO Max had joined the production and acquired the US rights. It was released in the United States as an HBO Max Original on 18 February 2021.

Red Production Company partnered with All3Media for international distribution of It's a Sin. In Australia it was released on the streaming service Stan on 23 January 2021 as well as TVNZ in New Zealand. Amazon Prime Video acquired the rights to stream in Canada and aired on Canal+ in France. Other countries the drama has been distributed to include South Korea on its streaming service Watcha Play, Nederlandse Publieke Omroep in Netherlands, RTBF in French-speaking Belgium, Canvas in Flemish Belgium and Amedia in Russia. In Greece, the series was shown back to back on Cosmote TV on 21 March and is also available watch on-demand via their platform.

Reception

Ratings
The first episode was watched live by 1.6 million viewers on Channel 4, a benchmark for a drama launch previously hit a year earlier by Deadwater Fell. It was the network's best-performing drama among young viewers (16–34) in three years. Catch-up views hit 2.5 million within three days of the live broadcast.

Channel 4 revealed on 4 February that the series had gained 6.5 million views on All 4 thus far, giving the streaming service its highest monthly figures to date for January, nearly doubling the previous figure. The series became the third biggest on the platform to date and its "most binged new series ever"; the first episode was the platform's biggest drama launch on record. By 1 March, this number had gone up to 18.9 million.

Official ratings are taken from BARB, utilising the four-screen dashboard which includes viewers who watched the programme on laptops, smartphones, and tablets. Pre-transmission data is included for all episodes other than episode 1 as the full box-set of the series was released on All 4 after the transmission of episode 1 on Channel 4.

Impact
The show created an upsurge in testing. The Terrence Higgins Trust charity reported that 8200 HIV testing kits were ordered in a single day. The previous high total for a single day was only 2800. Philip Normal produced a commemorative t-shirt featuring the slogan "La", which was a much used catchphrase in the show. The t-shirt helped raise £100,000 for the Terrence Higgins Trust. Alexander has expressed gratitude that the series was shown, saying "young gay people can’t believe it happened".

David Opie from Digital Spy reported that the show helped normalise the portrayal of gay sex on mainstream television. On 22 January 2021, a story published via The Sun raised concerns that tabloid news was unfairly reporting on gay sex. The original headline read "So much sex: It's a Sin viewers shocked by drama's explicit sex montage with raunchy threesome and oral sex." The sensational headline received criticism from the public who claimed the newspaper favoured heterosexual scenes. Journalists at The Sun responded by altering the article's wording to praise the series. They also issued an apology via LGBT news website PinkNews.

Critical reception

The series has been described as a "bonafide hit" upon release in the UK. Rotten Tomatoes reported an approval rating of 97% based on 75 reviews, with an average rating of 9.30/10. The website's critics consensus reads, "Propelled by an exquisite cast, empathetic writing, and a distinct visual style, It's a Sin is an incredible feat of small-screen magic." Metacritic gave the series a weighted average score of 91 out of 100 based on 26 reviews, indicating "universal acclaim".

The performance of the cast received widespread acclaim. Olly Alexander's performance received a positive review from Josh Smith from Glamour, who branded him the "heart of the show". In another review, Suzy Feay of the Financial Times explained how "frivolous, bitchy Ritchie could easily be played as caricature, but Olly Alexander gives him a magnetic charm". Keeley Hawes' performance in the final episode received praise from critics and viewers. Lucy Devine from Tyla.com described her performance as "outstanding and magnificent". Joel Leaver of the Daily Post branded her scenes as a "masterclass performance". Similarly, Flora Carr from Radio Times described her performance as "stunning" and "heartbreaking", noting that some critics originally expressed confusion over Hawes' casting in the small role of Valerie, "a dowdy, cardigan-wearing Isle of Wight resident". Carr added that Hawes' performance in episode five quashed any confusion as she "turned in an acting tour de force as a mother whose grief and denial turns her vicious". Critics and viewers expressed their desire for Alexander and Hawes to win BAFTAs for their performances.

In January 2021, Scarlett Russell from The Times branded it "the most talked-about show of the moment". Lucy Mangan from The Guardian praised the series, naming it a "poignant masterpiece". Of the character development she said "(Davies creates) real, flawed, entirely credible bundles of humanity and make it clear, without even momentary preachiness, how much they have to lose." Mangan drew comparisons to the COVID-19 pandemic, expanding that in its wake she felt that people could "empathise that bit more with the fear, uncertainty and responses rational and irrational to the emergence of a new disease." She concluded that any suggestions the series does not take its subject matter seriously enough are "nonsense". Adrian Lobb from The Big Issue praised the series for its characters. He stated "the journeys the characters in It's A Sin embark on over the decade the drama spans are truly profound." He noted the way the characters deal with HIV take viewers to the "outer reaches of the emotional galaxy."

A review of the first episode in the Radio Times was also broadly positive, summarising that "Russell T. Davies portrays London's early 1980s gay scene as giddily optimistic – but foreshadows the AIDS crisis to come." Davies' writing received acclaim, with Den of Geek opining that the series was a "soaring tribute" and a "must-watch", declaring it "Davies’ best yet; a joyful tribute to lost lives that delivers a seething verdict on ignorance and cruelty". Similarly, Guy Pewsy of Grazia described the show as "beautifully written and impeccably acted" and named it "one of the most beautiful explorations of gay life that I have ever seen". Nick Levine writing for NME opined that It's a Sin gradually develops "a thick veil of poignancy." They described the characters as "warm, flawed and sometimes frustrating". James Delingpole from The Spectator branded Davies' casting of mainly gay actors "blatant hypocrisy" but thought the show was "hugely entertaining". Elton John praised the show as a "triumph of creativity and humanity", adding that it was a "moving testament to a pivotal and important moment in LGBTQ history. The cast are sublime." Ian McKellen also praised the series and called Davies "the most imaginative of writers for television".

The Los Angeles Times gave a mixed review about the series, noting that while it claimed to be the first AIDS-related drama on British television, it actually wasn't. "This selective history is only compounded by the series’ positioning as the first to tell the story of AIDS on British TV, when in truth experimental films about AIDS appeared on television there throughout the first decade of the epidemic, notably on Channel 4 itself. The network was established in 1982 with a remit to “appeal to tastes and interests not generally catered for” by existing British broadcasters, and the wide range of queer work it commissioned included Derek Jarman’s AIDS elegy “Blue” (1993) and Stuart Marshall’s AIDS activist films “Bright Eyes” and “Over Our Dead Bodies.” If Davies found time to resurrect the Tombstone ad and the 1980s version of “Doctor Who,” why couldn't any of “It’s a Sin’s” lead quintet have been seen watching the British gay anthology series “Out on Tuesday”?

It's a Sin's soundtrack includes numerous artists from the 1980s including Pet Shop Boys, Kate Bush, Kelly Marie, Blondie, Erasure and Culture Club. El Hunt from music magazine NME noted that the series uses "a faultless selection of queer anthems and 80s smash hits that take on a new resonance." Annabel Nugent from The Independent praised the soundtrack stating "it manages to produce a feeling more substantial than that generic, cookie cutter kind of nostalgia."

Awards and nominations

References

External links
  – official website at Channel 4
 

2020s British LGBT-related drama television series
2020s British television miniseries
2021 British television series debuts
2021 British television series endings
2021 in LGBT history
Channel 4 television dramas
HBO Max original programming
Gay-related television shows
HIV/AIDS in television
HIV/AIDS in the United Kingdom
Television series by Red Production Company
Television series created by Russell T Davies
Television series set in 1981
Television series set in 1983
Television series set in 1984
Television series set in 1986
Television series set in 1988
Television series set in 1991
Television shows set in London
Television shows shot in Liverpool